Marlton is a census-designated place (CDP) located within Evesham Township in Burlington County, in the U.S. state of New Jersey. As of the 2020 United States Census, the CDP had a population of 10,594 residents, reflecting a 4.5% increase from the 10,133 enumerated at the 2010 U.S. Census, in turn a 1.2% decrease from the 10,260 counted at the 2000 census.

While Marlton represents only a small part of Evesham Township, many people colloquially use refer to the entire township as Marlton.

History
Marlton was founded by Welsh and English farmers beginning in 1676. The name Marlton first appeared in the early 19th century. The name is derived from marl clay, which is commonly found in the local soil. The discovery of the marl content helped local business and farmers, and caused the first "building boom", occurring in the 1830s and 1840s. Marl continued to be excavated in Marlton until 1930, when the pits were shut down. The marl was sold locally, and shipped directly, by rail to Burlington City, Philadelphia, Pennsylvania, and Atlantic City, for reshipping as an alternate for green manure, water treatment amendment, and semi-flowable fill.

Landmarks
PH-32, a Project Nike missile base from the Cold War, was completed in 1955 on a  site located near Marlton Middle School.

Geography

Demographics

2010 census

2000 census
As of the 2000 U.S. census, there were 10,260 people, 4,097 households, and 2,728 families residing in Marlton. The racial makeup of Marlton was 91.32% White, 2.88% Black or African American, 0.14% Native American, 4.18% Asian, 0.01% Pacific Islander, 0.59% from other races, and 0.89% from two or more races. Hispanic or Latino of any race were 2.34% of the population.

There were 4,097 households, out of which 30.7% had children under the age of 18 living with them, 54.3% were married couples living together, 9.3% had a female householder with no husband present, and 33.4% were non-families. 28.4% of all households were made up of individuals, and 7.8% had someone living alone who was 65 years of age or older. The average household size was 2.49 and the average family size was 3.12.

In Marlton, the population was spread out, with 23.5% under the age of 18, 6.6% from 18 to 24, 34.8% from 25 to 44, 23.2% from 45 to 64, and 12.0% who were 65 years of age or older. The median age was 37 years. For every 100 females, there were 93.8 males. For every 100 females age 18 and over, there were 91.2 males.

The median income for a household in Marlton was $52,271, and the median income for a family was $61,217. Males had a median income of $46,905 versus $31,798 for females. The per capita income for Marlton was $25,145. About 2.1% of families and 3.5% of the population were below the poverty line, including 3.6% of those under age 18 and 2.9% of those age 65 or over.

Transportation
NJ Transit provides bus service on the 406 route to and from Philadelphia.

The Marlton Circle was a traffic circle at the intersection of Route 70 and Route 73. In 2010, the circle was completely eliminated and replaced with a grade-separated interchange where Route 73 crosses over Route 70. The new traffic pattern was completed in late 2011.

The Philadelphia Marlton and Medford Railroad made multiple stops in Marlton from July 1881 to September 24, 1927.

Notable people

People who were born in, residents of, or otherwise closely associated with Marlton include:
 Brian Baldinger (born 1960), former NFL offensive tackle and current Fox Sports commentator.
 Esther E. Baldwin (1840–1910), missionary, teacher and writer.
 Jay Black (born 1976), stand-up comic and screenwriter.
 Braille (stage name of Bryan Winchester, born 1981), rapper.
 Sheldon Brown (born 1979), defensive back for the Philadelphia Eagles and the Cleveland Browns.
 Greg Burke (born 1982), former professional baseball pitcher who played for the San Diego Padres and New York Mets
 Anthony Caruso (born 1966), entrepreneur.
 Mike Devlin (born 1969), former NFL offensive lineman who has been an assistant coach with the New York Jets.
 Christina Grimmie (1994–2016), YouTube musician and season 6 contestant on The Voice.
 Andy Kim (born 1982), politician who is the representative from New Jersey's 3rd congressional district.
 Pelle Lindbergh (1959–1985), former goaltender for the Philadelphia Flyers.
 LeSean McCoy (born 1988), running back with the Tampa Bay Buccaneers.
 Jody McDonald (born 1959), sports radio talk show host on WTEL 610 and also on WFAN 660.
 Brit Morgan (born 1987), actress who has portrayed Debbie Pelt in the HBO series True Blood.
 Blaine Neal (born 1978), former Major League Baseball relief pitcher.
 Jessica O'Rourke (born 1986), professional soccer player.
 Jerry Penacoli (born 1956), actor, former newscaster, current correspondent on Extra.
 Richard Ruccolo (born 1972), actor who has appeared in Two Guys and a Girl and Rita Rocks.
 Chris Therien (born 1971), former defenseman for the Philadelphia Flyers and Dallas Stars. Currently works as a color commentator for the Philadelphia Flyers.
 Carl Truscott (born 1957), former Director of the Bureau of Alcohol, Tobacco, Firearms and Explosives.
 Jessica Woodard (born 1995), track and field athlete who competes in shot put.

References

Further reading
 Horner, Maurice W. A History of Evesham Township. (Philadelphia: Dorrance, 1971).
 McCabe, Wayne T.  A Penny A View...An Album of Postcard Views...Marlton, N.J. (Newton, NJ: Historic Preservation Alternatives, 2001).

1676 establishments in New Jersey
Census-designated places in Burlington County, New Jersey
Evesham Township, New Jersey
Populated places established in 1676